Znamenka is a rural locality (a selo) and the administrative centre of Znamensky Selsoviet, Belebeyevsky District, Bashkortostan, Russia. The population was 1,879 as of 2010. There are 36 streets.

Geography 
Znamenka is located 37 km east of Belebey (the district's administrative centre) by road. Novokazanka is the nearest rural locality.

References 

Rural localities in Belebeyevsky District